Anthony Cuthbert Baines (1912–1997)  was an English organologist who produced a wide variety of works on the history of musical instruments, and was a founding member of the Galpin Society.

He attended Westminster School and then read for a degree in chemistry at Christ Church, Oxford. He subsequently won a scholarship to the Royal College of Music as a bassoon player, and went on to perform with the London Philharmonic Orchestra.

Selected publications
 Woodwind Instruments and their History (London: Faber & Faber, 1957; reprinted 1962, 1967, 1991)
 Bagpipes (Oxford: Oxford University Press, 1960; reprinted 1979, 1995), 
 Musical Instruments Through the Ages (Harmondsworth: Pelican, 1961; revised edition, London: Faber, 1966),  
 European and American Musical Instruments (London: B. T. Batsford, 1966; London: Chancellor, 1983)
 Brass Instruments: Their History and Development (London: Faber, 1976; reprinted New York: Dover, 1993)
 The Bate Collection of Historical Wind Instruments (Oxford University, Faculty of Music, 1976), 
 The Oxford Companion to Musical Instruments (Oxford: Oxford University Press, 1992),

Bibliography
 Jeremy Montagu: "Anthony Baines, 1912–97", in Early Music vol. 25 (1997), May, pp. 345–346.
 Joan Rimmer: "Anthony Cuthbert Baines, 1912–1997: A Biographical Memoir", in: The Galpin Society Journal vol. 52 (1999), April, pp. 11–26.
 https://www.thebritishacademy.ac.uk/documents/373/115p053.pdf

References

1912 births
1997 deaths
20th-century British musicologists
English musicologists
History of the bagpipes
Organologists
Fellows of the British Academy
Alumni of the Royal College of Music
Alumni of Christ Church, Oxford
Royal Tank Regiment officers
British Army personnel of World War II
British World War II prisoners of war
People educated at Westminster School, London
20th-century British conductors (music)
British bassoonists
British schoolteachers
Fellows of University College, Oxford